Prodoxus atascosanellus is a moth of the family Prodoxidae. It is found from the Houston area of coastal Texas in the United States, south to the Mexican state of Michoacán, and west to the state of Durango.

The wingspan is 8.6-10.8 mm for males and 9.1-12.5 mm for females. The forewings are white, but mostly with a dark brown coloration. The hindwings are light gray or gray at base, then gradually becoming gray along the outer edge. Adults are on wing from mid February to May.

The larvae feed on Yucca treculeana, Yucca filifera and Yucca decipiens. They feed superficially inside the flowering stalk of their host plant.

Etymology
The species name refers to the type locality, Laguna Atascosa National Wildlife Refuge, in the Rio Grande/Rio Bravo river delta of southern Texas.

References

Moths described in 2005
Prodoxidae